Theory, Culture & Society is a peer-reviewed academic journal that was established in 1982 and covers sociology, cultural, and social theory. The journal aims to work "across the borderlines between sociology and cultural studies, the social sciences and the humanities and has moved towards a broader transdisciplinary frame of reference."  It is published by SAGE Publications. The editor-in-chief is Mike Featherstone (Goldsmiths, University of London). The journal is also linked  to the journal Body & Society and has its own book series  featuring the work of theorists.

Abstracting and indexing 
The journal is abstracted and indexed in:

According to the Journal Citation Reports, the journal has a 2019 impact factor of 2.810, ranking it 1st out of 45 journals in the category "Cultural Studies".

References

External links 
 

SAGE Publishing academic journals
Bimonthly journals
English-language journals
Sociology journals
Publications established in 1982
Cultural journals